Oxenholme is a village in England just south of the town of Kendal, with which it has begun to merge. It is best known for Oxenholme Lake District railway station on the West Coast Main Line. Because Oxenholme does not have its own church it is technically a hamlet.

History
Oxenholme station opened in 1847 as Kendal Junction and was renamed Oxenholme in 1860. The village grew around the station and is named after Oxenholme Farm. The station name had the suffix "Lake District" added in 1988.

The Grayrigg rail crash happened on 23 February 2007 between Oxenholme and Tebay on the West Coast Main Line.

Name
Oxenholme is named after a farm which name suggests was a cow farm. It is pronounced Oxen-Home, however locally it is pronounced Ox-nome The village has always been called and spelt Oxenholme.

Governance
The village is part of the Kendal civil parish.

The village is in the Kendal South and Natland ward on South Lakeland District Council and is currently represented by the Liberal Democrat Jonathan Brook, Chris Hogg and Doug Rathbone. The village is in Cumbria but before 1974 was in Westmorland. On Cumbria County Council it is part of the Kendal South ward for which the councillor is Liberal Democrat Brenda Gray.

It is part of the Westmorland and Lonsdale constituency and the MP is Liberal Democrat Tim Farron.

Crime
Oxenholme has a low crime rate; during 2009 there was only one reported crime, involving a light cable being removed from a trailer.

Health
The village is part of the Cumbrian National Health Service area. Westmorland General Hospital, which is the local hospital, is located just outside the village.

Transport

Oxenholme station, located in the village, is a junction between the West Coast Main Line and the Windermere Branch Line. The A65 runs through the village and is close to the M6 motorway. The village has nine bus stops and is served by routes 41, 41A and 561.

The nearest airports are  Leeds Bradford (62 miles) and Teesside International (70 miles) and Manchester (78 miles).

Media
The local newspaper covering the area is The Westmorland Gazette.

Local radio includes BBC Radio Cumbria, Heart North West and Smooth North West.

The village is covered by both the ITV Border and BBC North West TV regions.

Oxenholme in the news
Oxenholme appears in the news more often than a typical settlement of its size. Most of the news is to do with the railway.

 On 10 February 1965 fugitive John Middleton shot two policemen while hiding in the waiting room at Oxenholme railway station. Carlisle policemen George Russell and Alex Archibald were shot, and Russell died in hospital a few hours later.
 On 27 May 2006, a 19-year-old man was stabbed aboard a Glasgow-Paignton train as it was coming into the station. A 22-year-old man was jailed for 21 years for the murder in November 2006.
 The Grayrigg rail crash happened on 23 February 2007 when a Virgin Pendolino train derailed just after leaving the station. The crash left one person dead, and 22 others injured.

Location grid

References

External links

Oxenholme Past: oxenholme.oneplacestudy.org provides further information about Oxenholme's past including details of former residents, past news stories etc.

Westmorland
Villages in Cumbria